Dullewala  is a town in the Bhakkar District in Punjab, Pakistan.

Dullewala in Punjab with its 50,000 inhabitants is located in Pakistan – roughly 155 mi (or 249 km) South-West of Islamabad, the seat of the Pakistani government. Dullewala is famous by the name of Ameer Abdullah Khan Baloch who was the Son in Law of Great Meer Chakar_e_ Azam Rind میر چاکرِ اعظم رند. His daughter Mulaim Bibi was wife of Ameer Abdullah Khan Baloch. Ameer Abdullah Khan Baloch also established a fort in the Town.

Town has a big market of gram, Islam Daal Mills is famous gram factory.

Schools that are familiar for its quality education as

 Pakistan Public School and College
 Allied School
 Ghazi Education System
 Al-Qalam Public School
 Al Syed Model Public School Dullewala

Dullewala is known to be the peaceful town because of its growing literacy rate, hospitality, purity and optimism. Casts with which the town is populated are Jhammat, Rawn, Miana, Sheikh, Mughal, Baloch, Malik, Haindan, Maachhi, Bhatti, Qazi, Arayin, Chheena, Awan, Saandi, Bihari, Ghoka, Chohan, Khan, Niazi, Bheen, Shahi, Ghallu, Darkhan, Lohar, Alzai, Khokhar, Gazar, Taili, Jutt, Joiya, Naai, Mochi, Dharhal, Janjar, Khodi, Chundi, Shah Syed, Wains, Gudara, Kumhar, Kallu, Kalyar, Tarair, Dogar, Gari, Pathan, Langah, Sailu, Choudhary, Jaura.

Editor

Waqas Gull

.

References

Populated places in Bhakkar District